Blancs-Coteaux is a commune in the department of Marne, northern France. The municipality was established on 1 January 2018 by merger of the former communes of Vertus (the seat), Gionges, Oger and Voipreux.

Population

See also 
Communes of the Marne department

References 

Communes of Marne (department)